The Erick Lehi and Ingrid Larsen Olson House is a historic house in River Heights, Utah. It was built in 1891 for Erick Lehi Olson, an immigrant from Sweden who converted to the Church of Jesus Christ of Latter-day Saints at age 16 and arrived in America in 1882.

His wife, née Ingrid Larsen, was also an immigrant from Sweden, where she converted to the LDS Church; she arrived in America in 1883. The Olsons lived in Logan before they moved to River Heights, where Olson served as the bishop and as the president of the Third Quorum of Elders of the Cache Stake. Their house was designed in the Queen Anne architectural style. It has been listed on the National Register of Historic Places since March 8, 1997.

References

National Register of Historic Places in Cache County, Utah
Queen Anne architecture in Utah
Houses completed in 1891
1891 establishments in Utah Territory